Nathrau or Nathdau is a village in Jodhpur district of Rajasthan state, India, and is part of the tehsil Balesar. There are many government and private schools in the Nathrau village. This village is without a railway line. Other villages close by include Dewatu, Dechu, Gilakor, Lorta, Peelwa and Thadiya etc.

Villages in Jodhpur district

Nathrau is a land of agriculture belt.